The 2003–04 Logan Cup was a first-class cricket competition held in Zimbabwe from 12 September 2003 – 12 April 2004. It was won by Mashonaland, who won three of their six matches to top the table with 78 points.

Points table

References

2003 in Zimbabwean cricket
2004 in Zimbabwean cricket
Domestic cricket competitions in 2003–04
Logan Cup